The Sea-to-Sky Corridor, often referred to as the Corridor or the Sea to Sky Country, is a region in British Columbia spreading from Horseshoe Bay through Whistler to the Pemberton Valley and sometimes beyond to include Birken and D'Arcy.  From Whistler on up, the region overlaps with the older and more historic Lillooet Country, of which Squamish, at the region's centre, was once the southward extension in the days when it was the rail-port terminus from the Interior, via Lillooet, and accessible from the Lower Mainland only by sea.  Most of the region is in the Squamish-Lillooet Regional District, although south of Britannia Beach a small part of the region is in the Greater Vancouver Regional District.

The term "Corridor" refers to the alignment of the region's towns along Highway 99, also known as the Sea to Sky Highway, which links together the regions' three main centres - Squamish, Whistler and Pemberton.  There is little development other than resource extraction outside the immediate vicinity of the highway and the towns along it, hence the linear character of the region.  As with the overlap with the historical region known as Lillooet Country from Cheakamus Canyon northwards, the southern part of the region overlaps with Greater Vancouver and also with a more general and less unified but identifiable region around Howe Sound, the islands and western shore of which are respectively part of the Gulf Islands and Sunshine Coast.

Communities
The Sea to Sky Country falls readily into three major subregions.  These are, south to north:

Howe Sound-Squamish
Lions Bay
Furry Creek
Britannia Beach
Darrell Bay (a.k.a. Shannon Falls)
Stawamus
Valleycliffe
Squamish
Brackendale
Chiyakmesh
Cheekye
Paradise Valley

Cheakamus-Whistler
Garibaldi (abandoned/condemned)
Pinecrest Estates
Black Tusk Estates
Whistler

Function Junction
Whistler Southside ("Gondola")
Alta Lake
Whistler Village
White Gold-Nesters
Mons
Alpine Meadows
Emerald Estates

Pemberton Valley
Pemberton
Pemberton Meadows
Mount Currie
Xitolacw
Owl Creek
Lillooet Lake

Birkenhead-Gates Valley
The designation Sea to Sky Highway ends at Mount Currie , though Highway 99 continues on northwards over Cayoosh Pass to Lillooet.  Locations beyond Mount Currie-Lillooet Lake along the route of the rail line and the frontier-era Douglas Road are not usually considered in the Corridor, but sometimes are even though they are not on the Sea to Sky Highway.  This further subregion is defined by the lower valley of the Birkenhead River and the Birken Valley and Gates Valley towards Anderson Lake.  Socially and economically this area is part of or adjunct to  the Pemberton subregion, though not in the Pemberton Valley:
"No. 10 Downing Street"

Birken-Gates Valley
Devine
D'Arcy (Nequatque)

Parks

Provincial

Murrin Provincial Park
Stawamus Chief Provincial Park
Alice Lake Provincial Park 
Garibaldi Provincial Park
Shannon Falls Provincial Park 
Brandywine Falls Provincial Park
Callaghan Lake Provincial Park
Nairn Falls Provincial Park
Birkenhead Lake Provincial Park
Joffre Lakes Provincial Park

Regional
Cat Lake Regional Park
Brohm Lake Regional Park

Municipal
Lost Lake Park, Whistler
Rainbow Lodge, Whistler
One Mile Lake, Pemberton

See also
Lower Mainland
Sunshine Coast

External links